Civella is a surname. Notable people with the surname include:

Anthony Civella (1930–2006), American criminal
Carl Civella (1910–1994), American criminal, father of Anthony and brother of Nicholas
Nicholas Civella (1912–1983), American criminal

See also
Crivella